USCGC Thetis (WPC-115), a steel-hulled, diesel-powered  of the United States Coast Guard.

History

Coast Guard service
The contract for her construction was awarded to the Bath Iron Works, Bath, Maine on 21 January 1931.  She was commissioned as Coast Guard Patrol Boat No. 1 on 1 December 1931.

Assigned to the homeport of Stapleton, New York in 1931 she was transferred to Boston, Massachusetts in 1935.  On 1 July 1941, four months in advance of the directive whereby the United States Coast Guard was transferred from the United States Department of the Treasury to the United States Navy, Thetis and five of her sister ships were turned over to the Navy. This action occurred simultaneously with the establishment of the four Sea Frontiers.

Four s, including Thetis, were assigned to the East Coast Sound School, Key West, Florida, for duty as patrol and training vessels. Their collateral duties included operating under the aegis of Commander, Task Force 6, on Gulf patrol duties.

World War II
At the time of the Japanese Attack on Pearl Harbor on 7 December 1941, Thetis was operating out of Key West. In or around February 1942, Thetis was classified as a patrol craft and given the hull classification symbol WPC-115.

Thetiss antisubmarine warfare (ASW) training missions were conducted along with local patrol and escort duties out of Key West from 1941 to June 1945.

Post war service
In June 1945, Thetis was assigned to air-sea rescue service with the Third Coast Guard District. She was decommissioned on 1 July 1947 and sold on 1 July 1948.

Citations

References used

External links

Thetis-class patrol boats
Ships of the United States Coast Guard
World War II patrol vessels of the United States
Ships built in Bath, Maine
1931 ships